Marpol Annex I is the first implementation made by Marpol 73/78, one of the most important international marine environmental conventions. The convention was designed to minimize pollution of the seas from ships. The objective of the convention is to preserve the marine environment through the complete elimination of pollution by oil and other harmful substances and the minimization of accidental discharge of such substances.  The Marpol Annex I began to be enforced on October 2, 1983, and it details the prevention of pollution by oil and oily water.

Marpol Annex I details the discharge requirements for the prevention of pollution by oil and oily materials. It continues to enforce the oil discharge criteria described in the 1969 amendments to the 1954 Oil Pollution Convention. It also introduces the idea of "special areas" which are considered to be at risk to oil pollution.  Discharge of oil within them have been completely outlawed but there are a few minor exceptions.

Also in 2003, in a joint effort IMO and MEPC came out with Circ.406 Guidelines for Application of MARPOL Annex I Requirements to FPSOs and FSUs.

Later in 2006, the United States Coast Guard published Guidance for the Enforcement of MARPOL Annex I During PSC Examinations.  This was a USCG policy letter that provided instruction to PSC officers with regard to Oil Record Book, Oily Water Separators, and Oil content meter inspections during PSC visits.

The first half of Marpol Annex I deals with engine room waste. There are many new technologies and equipment that have been developed to prevent waste such as: Oily water separators (OWS), Oil Content meters (OCM), and Port Reception Facilities.

The second part of the Marpol Annex I has more to do with cleaning the cargo areas and tanks. Oil Discharge Monitoring Equipment (ODME) is a technology that has greatly helped improve efficiency and environmental protection in these areas.

See also 
 Marpol 73/78
 IMO
 Oily water separators
 Oily water separator (marine)
 Oil content meter
 Oil Discharge Monitoring Equipment
 Magic Pipe
 OCDMCS

References 

Ocean pollution